The Perfect Famine is a 2002 British documentary film directed by Steve Bradshaw and Christopher Walker.

References

External links
 

2002 films
2002 documentary films
Films shot in Malawi
British documentary films
2000s English-language films
2000s British films